Redfield is a city in and the county seat of Spink County, South Dakota, United States. The population was 2,214 at the 2020 census. The city was named for J. B. Redfield, a railroad official.

Geography

Redfield has been assigned the ZIP code 57469 and the FIPS place code 53460.

History
The first settlers arrived in the Redfield area in 1878, and a post office was established two years later under the name "Stennett Junction." The "Redfield" name was adopted in 1881. The town became the seat of Spink County in 1886, following a six-year legal and political battle among several Spink County towns. Redfield rapidly became a major town in the region, due in part to its status as a railroad center—the town was a crossroads of two lines of the Chicago and North Western Railway, and was also served by the Milwaukee Road Railroad. Railroads brought supplies, people, and animals, and also provided for transportation of crops back East.

Redfield College was established in the town in 1887, and operated until 1932. In 1902 the "Northern Hospital for the Insane," a state institution, opened on a campus just north of town. That facility remains in operation today as the South Dakota Developmental Center.

Demographics

2010 census
As of the census of 2010, there were 2,333 people, 1,057 households, and 593 families living in the city. The racial makeup of the city was 96.9% White, 0.5% African American, 0.9% Native American, 0.1% Asian, 0.5% from other races, and 1.1% from two or more races. Hispanic or Latino of any race were 1.4% of the population.

There were 1,057 households, of which 25.4% had children under the age of 18 living with them, 43.3% were married couples living together, 8.9% had a female householder with no husband present, 3.9% had a male householder with no wife present, and 43.9% were non-families. 39.5% of all households were made up of individuals, and 21.2% had someone living alone who was 65 years of age or older. The average household size was 2.13 and the average family size was 2.82.

The median age in the city was 47.3 years. 22.4% of residents were under the age of 18; 5.8% were between the ages of 18 and 24; 19% were from 25 to 44; 26.7% were from 45 to 64; and 26.2% were 65 years of age or older. The gender makeup of the city was 46.7% male and 53.3% female.

2000 census
As of the census of 2000, there were 2,897 people, 1,123 households, and 656 families living in the city. The population density was 1,670.3 people per square mile (646.6/km2). There were 1,261 housing units at an average density of 727.1 per square mile (281.4/km2). The racial makeup of the city was 95.37% White, 0.41% African American, 3.00% Native American, 0.10% Asian, 0.03% Pacific Islander, 0.21% from other races, and 0.86% from two or more races. Hispanic or Latino of any race were 0.66% of the population.

There were 1,123 households, out of which 26.2% had children under the age of 18 living with them, 46.9% were married couples living together, 8.6% had a female householder with no husband present, and 41.5% were non-families. 38.6% of all households were made up of individuals, and 23.2% had someone living alone who was 65 years of age or older. The average household size was 2.15 and the average family size was 2.87.

In the city, the population was spread out, with 21.3% under the age of 18, 7.8% from 18 to 24, 27.2% from 25 to 44, 20.0% from 45 to 64, and 23.7% who were 65 years of age or older. The median age was 41 years. For every 100 females, there were 106.8 males. For every 100 females age 18 and over, there were 104.2 males.

As of 2000 the median income for a household in the city was $27,743, and the median income for a family was $37,500. Males had a median income of $27,566 versus $20,938 for females. The per capita income for the city was $15,505. About 9.6% of families and 10.5% of the population were below the poverty line, including 9.9% of those under age 18 and 11.8% of those age 65 or over.

Media

AM Radio

FM Radio

Notable people
 Joseph Charron-Roman Catholic bishop
 Hallie Flanagan-Director of the Federal Theatre Project.
 Carrie Ingalls-teacher and journalist for De Smet News
 Conde McCullough-Bridge engineer.
 Gene Roth-actor who appeared with The Three Stooges
 Arthur H. Parmelee-college football coach and physician
 Thomas J. Walsh-US senator from Montana
 Chuck Welke-educator and South Dakota state legislator

References

Cities in Spink County, South Dakota
Cities in South Dakota
County seats in South Dakota
Populated places established in 1880
1880 establishments in Dakota Territory